Burton Constable is a village and civil parish in the East Riding of Yorkshire, England.

The civil parish is formed by the village of Burton Constable and the hamlets of Marton and West Newton.
According to the 2011 UK census, Burton Constable parish had a population of 127, an increase on the 2001 UK census figure of 120.

It is the site of the Grade I listed Burton Constable Hall.

Burton Constable was served from 1864 to 1964 by Burton Constable railway station on the Hull and Hornsea Railway.

Marmaduke Tunstall, the eighteenth-century ornithologist, was born in the village.

References

External links

Villages in the East Riding of Yorkshire
Holderness
Civil parishes in the East Riding of Yorkshire